CKCO may refer to:

 CKCO-DT, a television station (channel 13) licensed to Kitchener, Ontario, Canada
 CIWW, a radio station (1310 AM) licensed to Ottawa, Ontario, Canada, which held the call sign CKCO from 1922 to 1949